The Manatí Sugar Company was an American-owned sugar company in Cuba.

References

1912 establishments in Cuba
Sugar companies